Liza Rachetto (born January 30, 1974) is an American professional racing cyclist, who currently rides for UCI Women's Continental Team .

See also
 List of 2016 UCI Women's Teams and riders

References

External links
 

1974 births
Living people
American female cyclists
Sportspeople from Boise, Idaho
21st-century American women